Valamaz is the name of several rural localities in the Udmurt Republic, Russia:
Valamaz, Krasnogorsky District, Udmurt Republic, a selo in Valamazsky Selsoviet of Krasnogorsky District
Valamaz, Seltinsky District, Udmurt Republic, a selo in Valamazsky Selsoviet of Seltinsky District